Acalolepta pseudodentifera is a species of beetle in the family Cerambycidae. It was described by Stephan von Breuning in 1942. It is known from Malaysia.

References

Acalolepta
Beetles described in 1942